Mario Agapito Peré Peré (1902 – July 12, 1949) was a Cuban third baseman who played in the Negro leagues in the 1930s.

A native of Limonar, Cuba, Peré played for the Cuban Stars (East) in 1935. In seven recorded games, he posted four hits in 29 plate appearances. Peré died in Mexico City, Mexico in 1949 at age 46 or 47.

References

External links
Baseball statistics and player information from Baseball-Reference Black Baseball Stats and Seamheads

1902 births
1949 deaths
Date of birth missing
Cuban Stars (East) players
Baseball third basemen
People from Matanzas Province
Cuban expatriate baseball players in the United States